Adolf Ossian Aschan (16 May 1860, Helsinki – 25 February 1939) was a Finnish chemist and politician. He was a member of the Parliament of Finland from 1910 to 1911, representing the Swedish People's Party of Finland (SFP). He served as the professor of chemistry at the University of Helsinki from 1908 to 1927.

References

External links
 Aschan, Ossian at Uppslagsverket Finland 
 

1860 births
1939 deaths
Politicians from Helsinki
People from Uusimaa Province (Grand Duchy of Finland)
Swedish People's Party of Finland politicians
Members of the Parliament of Finland (1910–11)
Finnish chemists
University of Helsinki alumni
Academic staff of the University of Helsinki
Members of the Göttingen Academy of Sciences and Humanities